Rodrigo Felinto Ibarra Epitácio Maia (born 12 June 1970) is a Brazilian politician and served as President of the Chamber of Deputies of Brazil between July 2016 and February 2021. Maia is the son of former Rio de Janeiro Mayor Cesar Maia and he is in his fifth term as congressman.
He was affiliated with the Democrats party, formerly PFL, from 1996 to 2021, when he was expelled for criticizing party president ACM Neto.

Biography 
Rodrigo Maia was born in Chile, while his father, the former Rio de Janeiro Mayor Cesar Maia was living in exile, and was registered at the Brazilian consulate in Santiago. Maia started economics at Candido Mendes University, but did not complete the course.

In 1990, before starting a career in politics, he worked for Banco BMG and then . From 1997 to 1998, Maia was Municipal Secretary of the Mayor of Rio de Janeiro.

In April 2012, he won the title of citizen of the State of Rio de Janeiro.

On 14 June 2021, the National Executive of the Democrats decided to expel Maia from the party, after conflicts between the party and the former President of the Chamber.

Personal life
He has been married to Patrícia Vasconcelos since 2005. Maia is the father of four children.

Operation Car Wash 
Rodrigo Maia's name appears in Operation Car Wash. According to the Brazilian weekly magazine Epoca, he exchanged text messages with contractor Léo Pinheiro, from  regarding electoral donations. On 8 February 2017, Jornal Nacional reported that the Federal Police investigation had concluded that there were signs of passive corruption and money laundering. He is accused of providing "political favors" and defending OAS interests in Congress in 2013 and 2014. According to the Federal Police, Maia helped OAS by introducing an amendment to the provisional measure that created rules for regional aviation. Investigators believe that Maia asked the contractor for $1 million reais in electoral donations in 2014 (this money was officially given to Cesar Maia, Rodrigo Maia's father, campaign) and that this transfer was an attempt to hide the real origin of the money. Maia has denied any involvement. Given Maia's privilege as congressman, deciding whether to open investigations against him will be the responsibility of the federal Public Prosecutor's Office.

In August 2019, Brazil's Federal Police found evidence of corruption and money laundering related to Rodrigo Maia. The federal police sent a final report on the investigation to the supreme court.

The biggest implicated company, Odebrecht kept an entire department to coordinate the payment of bribe to politicians. In the Car Wash Operation, officers seized several electronic spreadsheets linking the payments to nicknames. Every corrupt politician received a nickname based on physical characteristics, public trajectory, personal infos, owned cars/boats, origin place or generic preferences. Rodrigo Maia's nickname was 'Botafogo', alusing the football team who he cheers for.

References

External links 
Information in Portuguese from the Brazilian congress.

|-

|-

|-

1970 births
People from Santiago
Living people
Politicians from Santiago
Brazilian Social Democracy Party politicians
Presidents of the Chamber of Deputies (Brazil)